Antonee is a given name. Notable people with this name include the following:

Antonee Burke-Gilroy (born 1997), English-born-Australian footballer
Antonee Robinson (born 1997), American footballer

See also

Anhonee (disambiguation)
Antone
Antonie (given name)
Antonen